Townson is a rural locality in the Lockyer Valley Region, Queensland, Australia.

Geography 
Townson is a mountainous area. It is bounded to the west by the ridge of the Mistake Mountains range and to the east by the ridge of the Little Liverpool Range. Mount Mistake is part of the Mistake Mountains range in the north-west of the locality. Grass Tree Knob is a peak in the Little Liverpool Range in the east of the locality.

Mulgowie Townson Road is the only access through the locality and runs from Thornton towards the south to the west of Laidley Creek.

The land use along the valley floor along Laidley Creek is cropping. The more sloping land on the lower sides of the mountains are used for grazing on native vegetation. A part of the west of the locality (including Mount Mistake) is within the Main Range National Park which extends into a number of neighbouring localities: East Haldon, Goomburra, Tarome, and Moorang.

History 
Townson Provisional School opened on 1895. The school closed in 1903 but reopened in 1907, later becoming Townson State School. The school closed on 27 January 1964.

Education 
There are no schools in Townson. The nearest primary school is Thornton State School in neighbouring Thornton to the north. The nearest secondary school is Laidley State High School in Laidley to the north.

References 

Lockyer Valley Region
Localities in Queensland